Ester Banda was a Zambian politician. She served as a member of the National Assembly for Roan from 1964 to 1968 and was jointly one of the first elected female MPs in Zambia.

Biography
A member of the United National Independence Party (UNIP), Banda was appointed Under-Secretary of the Women's Brigade, having rallied support for the party in Ndola.

In the January 1964 general elections, Banda contested the Roan constituency as the UNIP candidate, and was elected to the Legislative Council, one of the three women elected alongside Margret Mbeba and Nakatindi Yeta Nganga. At independence later in 1964, the Legislative Council became the National Assembly. She lost her seat in the 1968 elections and later served as a district governor and UNIP's provincial secretary in Copperbelt Province.

References

United National Independence Party politicians
Members of the Legislative Council of Northern Rhodesia
Members of the National Assembly of Zambia
20th-century Zambian women politicians
20th-century Zambian politicians